Kuzarjev Kal is a settlement in the hills northwest of Novo Mesto in southeastern Slovenia. The area is part of the traditional region of Lower Carniola and is now included in the Southeast Slovenia Statistical Region.

References

External links
Kuzarjev Kal on Geopedia

Populated places in the City Municipality of Novo Mesto